New Jersey's 4th legislative district is one of 40 in the state. As of the 2011 apportionment the district covers the Camden County municipalities of Chesilhurst, Clementon, Gloucester Township, Laurel Springs, Lindenwold and Winslow Township; and the Gloucester County municipalities of  Monroe Township, Pitman and Washington Township.

Demographic characteristics
As of the 2020 United States census, the district had a population of 231,008, of whom 181,075 (78.4%) were of voting age. The racial makeup of the district was 147,084 (63.7%) White, 46,758 (20.2%) African American, 751 (0.3%) Native American, 8,282 (3.6%) Asian, 61 (0.0%) Pacific Islander, 11,505 (5.0%) from some other race, and 16,567 (7.2%) from two or more races. Hispanic or Latino of any race were 24,822 (10.7%) of the population.

The district's percentage of people of Asian origin, the elderly and Hispanics are all below the state average, while the percentage of foreign-born residents was the second lowest in the state based on 2000 Census data.

The district had 176,864 registered voters as of December 1, 2021, of whom 60,163 (34.0%) were registered as unaffiliated, 77,105 (43.6%) were registered as Democrats, 37,247 (21.1%) were registered as Republicans, and 2,349 (1.3%) were registered to other parties.

Political representation
For the 2022–2023 session, the district is represented in the State Senate by Fred H. Madden (D, Washington Township) and in the General Assembly by Paul D. Moriarty (D, Washington Township) and Gabriela Mosquera (D, Gloucester Township).

The legislative district is entirely located within New Jersey's 1st congressional district.

1965-1973
During the period of time after the 1964 Supreme Court decision in Reynolds v. Sims and before the establishment of a 40-district legislature in 1973, the 4th District consisted of all of Burlington County for the 1965 Senate election and a combination of Burlington and Ocean counties for the 1967, 1969, and 1971 Senate and Assembly elections.

In the 1965 election in which the senator was elected from voters from the entire district, incumbent Republican Senator from Burlington County Edwin B. Forsythe won re-election. For the 1967 Senate election for a four-year term which allowed for the election of two senators from the district, Senate candidates were nominated from each Assembly district. Republican William T. Hiering won from Assembly District 4A (consisting of all of Ocean County and rural eastern Burlington County) while Republican Forsythe won from District 4B, which consisted of the suburban remainder of Burlington. Forsythe was elected to Congress in 1970 and resigned on November 16, 1970 to take his seat there. Walter L. Smith Jr., a Republican Assemblyman, was elected to complete the remainder of Forsythe's term in a March 2, 1971 special election and was sworn in on March 15, 1971. In the 1971 general election for a two-year Senate term, again candidates were nominated by Assembly district (three districts in this instance). Republican John F. Brown won District 4A (most of Ocean County), Republican Barry T. Parker won from District 4B (Manchester, Berkeley townships and other small boroughs in Ocean County plus most of Burlington County), and Democrat Edward J. Hughes Jr. won from District 4C (suburban Burlington County).

For the Assembly elections held during this time, each district elected two members to the General Assembly. For the 1967 and 1969 elections, the Senate district was split into two districts and for the 1971 election, it was split into three. The members elected to the Assembly from each district are as follows:

Election history since 1973
Upon the creation of a 40-district legislative map in 1973, the new 4th District consisted of portions of Gloucester County (Elk Township, Glassboro, Washington Township, and Deptford Township), Camden County stretching from Gloucester City southeast to Winslow Township, northeast to Chesilhurst and Waterford Township, and into Burlington County's Shamong Township and Tabernacle Township.

In 1979, James Florio, then a Congressman, encouraged Daniel Dalton and Dennis L. Riley to run in the June primary under the label of the "Florio Democratic Team" against three-term incumbents Kenneth A. Gewertz and Francis J. Gorman, who had the support of Angelo Errichetti and the Camden County Democratic Organization. Dalton (with 31.3% of the vote) and Riley (with 28.3%) won the two ballot spots in the primary balloting. Dalton and Riley were elected in the November 1979 general election

In the 1981 redistricting, the 4th consisted of southern Camden County (including Waterford, Winslow, and Gloucester townships, plus Chesilhurst, Lindenwold, and Laurel Springs), most of southeastern Gloucester County, and the Atlantic County municipalities of Buena, Buena Vista Township, and Folsom.

South Jersey Democratic Party leader George Norcross informed Riley in February 1989 that he would not get official party support in the June 1989 party primary for a sixth term, with Riley's ballot spot—and Assembly seat—to be handed over to Ann A. Mullen, who had worked as a legislative aide to Riley and was serving as mayor of Gloucester Township. Riley told The Press of Atlantic City that his decade of service in the Assembly had left him "fatigued" and that he felt relief from the weight that was removed from him by being replaced by Mullen, whom he publicly endorsed as his successor.

After years in which the district had been solidly Democratic, the Republican sweep in 1991 led to a period in which the district became what PolitickerNJ called the "#1 swing seat" in the state for more than a decade. The 1990s iteration of the district was composed of Gloucester Township, Lindenwold, and Laurel Springs in Camden County and a larger portion of southeastern Gloucester County. In the 1991 elections, attorney John J. Matheussen won the open seat of the departing incumbent Democrat Daniel J. Dalton who had left office to take the post of Secretary of State of New Jersey, having been nominated for the position by Governor of New Jersey James Florio. In the 1991 Assembly race George F. Geist and Mary Virginia Weber took the seat of incumbent Ann A. Mullen and her Democratic running mate Timothy D. Scaffidi.

Sean F. Dalton, won an Assembly seat in the 1993 election in a split verdict, with Republican George Geist coming in first, Dalton in second, incumbent Republican Mary Virginia Weber out of the money in third place and Dalton's running mate Sandra Love in fourth. Geist and Dalton were re-elected in 1995, with Democrat Chris Manganello in third and Republican Gerald Luongo in fourth. The $1 million spent by the candidates in the 1993 Assembly race was the most of any district in the state, and The New York Times predicted that the parties would spend heavily in the 1995 race as each side tries to gain both seats. Dalton ran in 1997, and lost, in a bid for the New Jersey Senate seat held by John J. Matheussen, with Matheussen taking 50.7% of the vote, Dalton receiving 46.1% and Jame E. Barber garnering 3.2% of the vote. With Dalton's seat open in the Assembly, Geist won re-election as did his running mate Gerald Luongo. With Luongo receiving negative press over what The New York Times called a "questionable land deal", Democrat Robert J. Smith II knocked off Luongo in the 1999 general election, while Geist was re-elected.

In the 2001 reapportionment, Elk Township and Clayton from the Gloucester portion of the district but more boroughs in central Camden County were added. Matheussen was nominated by Governor Jim McGreevey in February 2003 to head the Delaware River Port Authority. After Matheussen resigned from the Senate in May 2003 to take the post at the DRPA, his Senate seat was filled by Assemblyman George Geist. In turn, the Republicans named Stephen Altamuro to fill Geist's vacancy in the Assembly. In the 2003 elections, the Democrats swept all three legislative seats, with Fred H. Madden defeating Geist in the Senate, and David R. Mayer and Robert J. Smith II winning in the Assembly race, knocking off incumbent Altamuro.

The 2011 apportionment added Chesilhurst and Winslow Township, both from the 6th District. Municipalities that had been in the 4th District as part of the 2001 apportionment that were shifted out of the district as of 2011 are Franklin Township (Gloucester), Glassboro, and Newfield (all to the 3rd District). In the 2011 Assembly race, Democrat Gabriela Mosquera took the seat that had been held by Republican Domenick DiCicco, who had been shifted out of the district in the 2011 reapportionment. Democratic incumbent Paul D. Moriarty and Mosquera won the election, though Mosquera's victory was challenged based on her not having been a resident of the district for a full year and she did not take office until March 2012 in the face of legal challenges.

Election history

Election results, 1973–present

Senate

General Assembly

Election results, 1965–1973

Senate

District 4 At-large

District 4A

District 4B

District 4C

General Assembly

District 4A

District 4B

District 4C

References

Camden County, New Jersey
Gloucester County, New Jersey
04